Sigma Huda is a Bangladeshi lawyer. She was the founding president of Bangladesh Women Lawyers Association (BNWLA) and founder and secretary of Institute for Law and Development (ILD). 

In 2007, she was awarded Pope John Paul II Wellspring of Freedom Award for dedicating her life to upholding human rights and combating injustice. Her late husband, Nazmul Huda, was a former Bangladesh Nationalist Party government minister and barrister.

Career
Huda was the lawyer of Anup Chetia alias Golap Barua, a leader of ULFA who filed for asylum in Bangladesh.

Activism
Since 2004, Huda has served as a United Nations special rapporteur on human trafficking. She is also known for her views on prostitution. In her report for the United Nations Commission on Human Rights, she says:

Charges and convictions
In 2007, Huda was brought before a Bangladeshi court on bribery charges filed by the Anti-Corruption Commission, whereupon she was sentenced to three years imprisonment as an accomplice to a bribe in the amount of Taka 2.40 crore (approximately US$400,000) for which her husband was convicted of abuse of power and corruption.

The UN Special Rapporteur on the independence of the judges and lawyers issued a statement on September 2, 2007, expressing concern that Huda was not given a fair trial. He said it received reports indicating that the right to legal representation and the independence of the court were severely affected during her trial. "Defense lawyers felt pressured, they had no opportunity to visit her in prison, and could only meet with her at the end of the hearings. They also had difficulties accessing the case files and other relevant information, thus compromising their ability to ensure an adequate defence."

Personal life
Huda was married to barrister Nazmul Huda, a former Bangladesh Nationalist Party minister, former leader of Bangladesh Nationalist Front (BNF), National Alliance (NA), and leader of Bangladesh Manabadhikar Party (BMP) until his death.

References

Further reading
 
 
 
 
 
 

Living people
Bangladeshi women lawyers
United Nations special rapporteurs
Bangladeshi officials of the United Nations
Year of birth missing (living people)
Place of birth missing (living people)
20th-century Bangladeshi lawyers
21st-century Bangladeshi lawyers